A screen protector is an additional sheet of material—commonly polyurethane or laminated glass—that can be attached to the screen of an electronic device and protect it against physical damage.

History 
The first screen protector was designed and patented by Herbert Schlegel in 1968 for use on television screens.

Screen protectors first entered the mobile-device market after the rise of personal digital assistants (PDAs).  Since PDAs were often operated via a stylus, the tip of the stylus could scratch the sensitive LCD screen surface.  Therefore, screen protectors provided sacrificial protection from this damage. Since then, the ubiquity of mobile-devices have seen the screen protector become more widely used.

Materials 
Screen protectors are made of either plastics, such as polyethylene terephthalate (PET) or thermoplastic polyurethane (TPU), or of laminated tempered glass, similar to the device’s original screen they are meant to protect. At the same price, glass will resist scratches better than plastic, and feel more like the device's screen, though higher priced plastic protectors may be better than the cheapest tempered glass models, since glass will shatter or crack with sufficient impact force.

Surface
Screen protectors' surface can be glossy or matte. Glossy protectors retain the display's original clarity, while a matte ("anti-glare") surface facilitates readability in bright environments and mitigates stains such as finger prints.

Disadvantages 
Screen protectors have been known to interfere with the operation of some touchscreens.
Also, an existing oleophobic coating of a touchscreen will be covered, although some tempered glass screen protectors come with their own oleophobic coating.

On some devices, the thickness of screen protectors can affect the look and feel of the device.

Function 
The main function of this screen protector is to protect the LCD screen from all kinds of threats that can reduce user discomfort, such as:
 Scratches: scratches caused by blunt objects, with a protective film the LCD screen is protected against any scratches that could damage the screen surface.
 Sunlight: Exposure to sunlight can reduce the image quality of the LCD screen. With a screen protector, everyone can see the LCD screen clearly and not be disturbed by the reflection of sunlight. Also protects against glare of light. Some types can therefore allow more brightness to be used.
 Dust: Dirt adhering to the LCD screen is very difficult to clean because the LCD screen is a high sensitivity screen, with a protective film; it is easy to clean the LCD screen. If you are afraid to do cleaning, simply remove the dusty screen protector and replace it with a new one.
 Water: water on the LCD screen can be fatal to the surface of the screen. With the protection provided by the screen protector, water will not easily penetrate and damage components inside the LCD screen.

See also

 Smartphone

References 

Display technology